Howard Jones may refer to:

Howard Jones (British musician) (born 1955), English pop singer
Howard Jones (American musician) (born 1970), vocalist for Light The Torch 
Howard Jones (American football coach) (1885–1941), American football player and coach
Howard Jones (linebacker) (born 1990), American football player
Howard Mumford Jones (1892–1980), American critic and educator
Howard Andrew Jones, American speculative fiction author
Howard M. Jones (politician) (1900–1980), Democratic member of the Louisiana State Senate
Howard P. Jones (1899–1973), American diplomat
Howard Jones, professor and author of Mutiny on the Amistad, basis for film Amistad
Howard W. Jones (1910–2015), physician who pioneered in vitro fertilization in the United States